"Sin Fin" ("With No End") is a song written and performed by American singers Romeo Santos and Justin Timberlake. It is the second single for Santos' fifth studio album Formula, Vol. 3 (2022). Both the single and music video were released on September 1, 2022, on the same day as the album it is from.

Charts

Certifications

References 

2022 singles
2022 songs
Bachata songs
Romeo Santos songs
Justin Timberlake songs
Male vocal duets
Songs written by Romeo Santos
Spanish-language songs
Sony Music Latin singles